Li Shifeng (born 9 January 2000) is a Chinese badminton player. He is the All England Open champion in men's singles, winning the title in 2023.

Started playing badminton at the age of 6 with support from his father, Li then practiced in the Jiangxi team when he was in the elementary school, after that went to the Bayi team. At the age of 14, he participated in the National youth team training centre in Shenyang and entered the National second team in 2017. He was part of the Chinese junior team that won the gold medals at the 2017, 2018 World Junior Championships, and 2018 Asian Junior Championships. Li represented his country and competed at the 2018 Summer Youth Olympics in Buenos Aires, Argentina, and clinched the gold medal in the boys' singles event.

Achievements

Youth Olympic Games 
Boys' singles

World Junior Championships
Boys' singles

BWF World Tour (2 titles, 2 runners-up) 
The BWF World Tour, which was announced on 19 March 2017 and implemented in 2018, is a series of elite badminton tournaments sanctioned by the Badminton World Federation (BWF). The BWF World Tour is divided into levels of World Tour Finals, Super 1000, Super 750, Super 500, Super 300, and the BWF Tour Super 100.

Men's singles

BWF International Challenge/Series (2 runners-up) 
Men's singles

  BWF International Challenge tournament
  BWF International Series tournament
  BWF Future Series tournament

BWF Junior International (3 runners-up) 
Boys' singles

  BWF Junior International Grand Prix tournament
  BWF Junior International Challenge tournament
  BWF Junior International Series tournament
  BWF Junior Future Series tournament

References

External links 

 

 

2000 births
Living people
People from Nanchang
Badminton players from Jiangxi
Chinese male badminton players
Badminton players at the 2018 Summer Youth Olympics
Youth Olympic gold medalists for China
21st-century Chinese people